The 75th Pennsylvania House of Representatives District is located in central Pennsylvania and has been represented by Michael Armanini since 2021.

District profile
The 75th District encompasses parts of Clearfield County and all of Elk County, and includes the following areas:

Clearfield County

Bell Township
 Bloom Township
 Brady Township
Curwensville
DuBois
Falls Creek (Clearfield County Portion)
Ferguson Township
Grampian
Greenwood Township
Huston Township
Mahaffey
New Washington
Newburg
Penn Township
 Pike Township
 Sandy Township
 Troutville
 Union Township 

Elk County

Representatives

References

Government of Clearfield County, Pennsylvania
Elk County
75